The Coalport China Museum is one of the ten Ironbridge Gorge Museums administered by the Ironbridge Gorge Museum Trust. The museum is based in the village of Coalport within the Ironbridge Gorge on the northern bank of the River Severn in Shropshire, England. It is located in a World Heritage Site, the birthplace of the Industrial Revolution.

The museum presents the history of Coalport China, a manufacturer of fine English chinaware which was based on the site between 1795 and 1926. As well as original examples of historic china, there are also demonstrations of traditional ceramic techniques and original industrial buildings including kilns to fire the pottery. The collections include the official National Collections of Caughley and Coalport china.

There is a hands-on workshop area where painting activities are provided and ceramic activities in the school holidays.

The 1985 Doctor Who serial The Mark of the Rani used the museum as a filming location.

See also
Listed buildings in The Gorge

References

External links 

  Coalport China Museum website

Museums in Shropshire
Industry museums in England
Open-air museums in England
Archaeological museums in England
Industrial archaeological sites in Shropshire
History of Shropshire
Ironbridge Gorge
Ceramics museums in the United Kingdom
Ironbridge Gorge Museum Trust